"Tryst with Destiny" was an English-language speech delivered by Jawaharlal Nehru, the first Prime Minister of India, to the Indian Constituent Assembly in the Parliament House, on the eve of India's Independence, towards midnight on 14 August 1947. The speech spoke on the aspects that transcended Indian history. It is considered to be one of the greatest speeches of the 20th century and to be a landmark oration that captures the essence of the triumphant culmination of the Indian independence movement against British colonial rule in India.

Popular culture  
 The speech is referenced in the 1998 Hindi film Earth directed by Deepa Mehta. The film portrays the main characters listening to the speech over the radio, against the backdrop of the Hindu-Muslim riots following the Partition of India. This provides an interesting juxtaposition between the realities of Partition and the optimism that followed Independence.
 Hazaaron Khwaishein Aisi, a Hindi film by Sudhir Mishra that portrayed the political and social turbulence of the late 1960s and the '70s in India contains a clip of the speech and the narrative voice speaks of the souring of Nehru's dream within two decades of Independence.
 In the 2000 film Hey Ram directed by Kamal Haasan, parts of the speech are heard in the background providing the audience a timeline of the happenings in the movie.
 The book Midnight's Children by Salman Rushdie has a reference to this speech as does the novel Train to Pakistan by Khushwant Singh.
 The speech is sampled by trance artist John 00 Fleming in the album One Hundred Ten WKO during the fifth track, "The Stroke of the Midnight Hour".
 The musical group Kobo Town uses sound clips from this speech in their song "Sing Out, Shout Out" from their album Independence.
The Salman Khan film Bharat also used clips from the speech in their trailer.
The film Student of the Year mentioned the name of the speech as a clue in the treasure hunt game.
The Let's Crack It song owned by Unacademy made its intro using the actual speech voice clips.
2012 Hindi film Gangs of Wasseypur used clips from this speech in one of the shots featuring the character Shahid Khan.

See also
 The light has gone out of our lives

References

External links
Video of Nehru's "Tryst with Destiny" address 

Indian independence movement
History of the Republic of India
1947 in India
Nehru administration
1947 speeches
Jawaharlal Nehru